During the 2015–16 season AZ competed in the Eredivisie for the 18th consecutive season the KNVB Beker and the Europa League after qualifying for the 3rd qualification round due to finishing 3rd the previous season.

Background
European football returned after a one-year hiatus. John van den Brom finished third last season with Marco van Basten his assistant. Several key players moved elsewhere including captain Nemanja Gudelj and fan favourite Simon Poulsen.

Several youth players were promoted to the first team the same year the club won the Rinus Michels award for best youth academy and youth development programme in the Netherlands, beating Feyenoord who won this award each of the five preceding years.

Transfers

Arrivals 

 The following players moved to AZ.

Departures

 The following players moved from AZ.

Loans
 The following players moved to new clubs whilst under contract at AZ.

Pre-season friendlies
The first training session for the new season began on 28 June. Friendlies were arranged with smaller teams in the Netherlands as well as two additional friendlies against foreign teams touring the Netherlands. A training camp was also arranged the week before competitive football in the Europa League by 30 July.

Statistics

Europa League
AZ qualified for the 3rd qualification round of the Europa League after finishing the league in 3rd position in the previous season. Due to previous runs in the competition, the club had a high coefficient and was seeded for the draw meaning a favourable draw against weaker opposition was likely. The first game was scheduled for 30 July with the return leg on 6 August.

Statistics

Eredivisie

Statistics

League table

KNVB Beker

Statistics

Squad Performance

International Appearances

The following first team players either played or were involved for their respective national teams during the season:

Toulon Tournament
Three players were involved in this invitational tournament for youth teams throughout the world and all played for the Netherlands under 21s or Jong Oranje. The Netherlands team failed to progress from the group stages after two wins and two draws; France and The United States of America progressed from group A.

Gold Cup
Aron Jóhannsson is the only internationalist from the CONCACAF association eligible to play in this tournament.

EURO 2016 Qualification

Friendlies

UEFA Ranking 
After the 2014-15 season where AZ did not compete in European competitions the club fell 8 places to 44th.

This places the club in third place overall in domestic terms: Ajax (26) lead PSV (30) following AZ (44), FC Twente (45) and Feyenoord (95).

References 

AZ Alkmaar seasons
AZ Alkmaar